Howard Payne may refer to

 Edward Howard Payne (1849-1908), businessman in Missouri
 Howard Payne University, named after Edward Howard Payne
 Howard Payne (athlete) (1931–1992), Olympic athlete from England
 John Howard Payne (1791–1852), American actor, poet, playwright and author
 Howard Payne (Speed), fictional character